is a low-lying lake in Wakkanai, Hokkaidō, Japan. Its surface area of  makes it, by this metric, the twentieth largest on the island.

See also

 Cape Sōya
 Koetoi River
 Wakkanai Park

References

Onuma
Wakkanai, Hokkaido